The American Astronaut is a 2001 space Western musical film directed by and starring Cory McAbee. The film is set in a fictitious past, in which space travel is pioneered by roughnecks. The film was released on DVD in the spring of 2005. The band Billy Nayer Show, helmed by McAbee, wrote and performed the film's soundtrack.

Plot 
Space travel has become a dirty way of life dominated by derelicts, grease monkeys, thieves, and hard-boiled interplanetary traders such as Samuel Curtis (Cory McAbee), an astronaut from Earth who deals in rare goods, living or otherwise.

His mission begins with the unlikely delivery of a cat to a small outer-belt asteroid saloon where he meets his former dance partner, and renowned interplanetary fruit thief, the Blueberry Pirate (Joshua Taylor). As payment for his delivery of the cat, Curtis receives a homemade cloning device already in the process of creating a creature most rare in this space quadrant – a Real Live Girl.

At the suggestion of the Blueberry Pirate, Curtis takes the Real Live Girl to Jupiter where women have long been a mystery. There, he proposes a trade with the owner of Jupiter: the Real Live Girl clone for the Boy Who Actually Saw A Woman's Breast (Gregory Russell Cook). The Boy Who Actually Saw A Woman's Breast is regarded as royalty on the all-male mining planet of Jupiter because of his unique and exotic contact with a woman. It is Curtis’ intention to take The Boy to Venus and trade him for the remains of Johnny R., a man who spent his lifetime serving as a human stud for the Southern belles of Venus, a planet populated only by women. Upon returning Johnny R's body to his bereaved family on earth, Curtis will receive a handsome reward.

While hashing out the plan with the Blueberry Pirate, Curtis is spotted by his nemesis, Professor Hess (Rocco Sisto). Possessed by an enigmatic obsession with Curtis, Hess is capable of killing only without reason; that is, there can be no conflict nor unresolved issues with his intended victim. Hess has been pursuing Samuel Curtis throughout the solar system in order that he might forgive him, then kill him. Along the way, Hess has executed each and every individual to come into contact with Curtis.

Unaware of this danger, Curtis sets forth on his mission. After retrieving The Boy Who Actually Saw A Woman's Breast from Jupiter, Curtis is contacted by Professor Hess, who makes his intentions known. Fearful, Curtis and The Boy look for a place to hide. They come across a primitive space station constructed by Nevada State silver miners from the late 1800s. Inside they discover a small group of miners still alive, their bodies crippled and deformed by space atrophy. Unable to return home for fear that Earth's gravity would kill them, two of the miners mated and give birth to a boy known as Body Suit (James Ransone). He has been raised in a suit of hydraulics to simulate Earth's gravity with his parents' intention of him eventually being sent home. In trade for supplies and sanctuary, Curtis agrees to deliver Body Suit to Earth. Once they land on the lush planet of Venus, the terrain dramatically changes, and Curtis is inspired by a plan.

Cast
 Cory McAbee as Samuel Curtis / Silver Miner
 Rocco Sisto as Professor Hess
 Greg Russell Cook as The Boy Who Actually Saw A Woman's Breast
 James Ransone as Bodysuit
 Annie Golden as Cloris
 Joshua Taylor as Blueberry Pirate
 Tom Aldredge as Old Man
 Peter McRobbie as Lee Vilensky
 Bill Buell as Eddie
 Mark Manley as Henchman #1 (Hey Boy!)
 Ned Sublette as Henchman #2 (Hey Boy!)
 Joseph McKenna as Doorman
 Doug McKean as Silverminer Jake
 Bentley Wood as Young Johnny R.

Accolades 
 Cory McAbee won Special Jury Award at the Florida Film Festival (For original vision)
 W. Mott Hupfel III was nominated for best Cinematography at the Independent Spirit Awards
 Cory McAbee was nominated for the Grand Jury Prize at the Sundance Film Festival

References

External links 
 Official Movie Site
 FilmFreakCentral's review
 Review by Science Fiction Weekly
 Between Eraserhead and The Grapes of Wrath : The American Astronaut
 an essay about The American Astronaut
 
 

2001 films
2000s Western (genre) science fiction films
2000s musical comedy films
2000s science fiction comedy films
2001 black comedy films
2001 comedy films
2001 independent films
American Western (genre) science fiction films
American black comedy films
American independent films
American musical comedy films
American science fiction comedy films
American space adventure films
Films about astronauts
Space Western films
Venus in film
2000s English-language films
2000s American films